Dayton, Dayton Dandy, was a British automobile manufactured in 1922 by the Charles Day Manufacturing Co. Ltd. in the London Borough of Hackney W10.
The Dandy was a Cyclecar with a single cylinder Blackburne engine producing 4 hp (2.9 kW).

See also
 List of car manufacturers of the United Kingdom

References

Sources 
 Harald Linz und Halwart Schrader: Die Internationale Automobil-Enzyklopädie. United Soft Media Verlag GmbH, München 2008, 
 Nick Georgano: The Beaulieu Encyclopedia of the Automobile, Volume 1 A–F. Fitzroy Dearborn Publishers, Chicago 2001,  (englisch)
 David Culshaw & Peter Horrobin: The Complete Catalogue of British Cars 1895-1975. Veloce Publishing plc. Dorchester (1997). 

Cyclecars
Defunct motor vehicle manufacturers of England
Vehicles introduced in 1922
1922 in England
Defunct companies based in London